Pingxing Pass is a mountain pass in the Shanxi Province of China.

There is a section of the Great Wall of China there.

The Battle of Pingxingguan was fought here between the National Revolutionary Army's 8th Route Army of the Republic of China (under Communist Party of China control) and the Imperial Japanese Army on September 25, 1937.

Great Wall of China
Mountain passes of China
Landforms of Shanxi